"Mystery (of Love)" is a 1997 song by Italian DJ/producer Maurizio D'Ambrosio, released under the moniker Mephisto. It features vocals by Italian singer Simona Lazzarini and was a European club hit. A moderate hit on the charts, it peaked at number 18 in Denmark, number 21 in France and number 29 in Sweden. On the Eurochart Hot 100, it reached number 68 in July 1997. A music video was also made for the song.

Track listing

Charts

References

 

1997 singles
1997 songs
Eurodance songs
Electro songs
English-language Italian songs